Jozef Bomba (30 March 1939 – 27 October 2005) was a Slovak football defender. He impressed as a fast sprinter and excellent athletic footballer. During his career he played 279 matches and scored 8 goals at the Czechoslovak First League.

On 1 May 1960, Bomba made his international debut for Czechoslovakia in the 4–0 home win against Austria.
He was a participant of the 1962 FIFA World Cup for Czechoslovakia that finished as runners-up but he did not play any match.

External links
 ČMFS entry 

1939 births
2005 deaths
People from Bardejov
Sportspeople from the Prešov Region
Slovak footballers
Czechoslovak footballers
Czechoslovakia international footballers
1962 FIFA World Cup players
1. FC Tatran Prešov players
FC VSS Košice players
Association football defenders